Sivaraj Naalamuthu Pillai (born 25 April 1968) is an Indian weightlifter. He competed in the men's featherweight event at the 1992 Summer Olympics.

References

1968 births
Living people
Indian male weightlifters
Olympic weightlifters of India
Weightlifters at the 1992 Summer Olympics
Place of birth missing (living people)